This article provides details on candidates who stood for the 2004 Australian federal election. The election was held on 9 October 2004.

Redistributions and seat changes
Redistributions occurred in Victoria, Queensland and South Australia.
In Victoria, the Labor-held seat of Burke was renamed Gorton. The Labor-held seat of McMillan became notionally Liberal.
The member for Burke, Brendan O'Connor (Labor), contested Gorton.
In Queensland, the notionally Labor seat of Bonner was created. The Labor-held seat of Bowman became notionally Liberal.
The member for Bowman, Con Sciacca (Labor), contested Bonner.
In South Australia, the Labor-held seat of Bonython was abolished. The Liberal-held seat of Wakefield became notionally Labor.
The member for Bonython, Martyn Evans (Labor), contested Wakefield.

Retiring Members and Senators

Labor
 Laurie Brereton MP (Kingsford Smith, NSW)
 Janice Crosio MP (Prospect, NSW)
 Leo McLeay MP (Watson, NSW)
 Frank Mossfield MP (Greenway, NSW)
 Senator Nick Bolkus (SA)
 Senator Geoff Buckland (SA)
 Senator Peter Cook (WA)
 Senator Kay Denman (Tas)

Liberal
 Neil Andrew MP (Wakefield, SA)
 Bob Charles MP (La Trobe, Vic)
 Chris Gallus MP (Hindmarsh, SA)
 David Kemp MP (Goldstein, Vic)
 Daryl Williams MP (Tangney, WA)
 Senator Sue Knowles (WA)
 Senator Tsebin Tchen (Vic)

Independent
 Senator Brian Harradine (Tas)

House of Representatives
Sitting members at the time of the election are shown in bold text. Successful candidates are highlighted in the relevant colour. Where there is possible confusion, an asterisk (*) is also used.

Australian Capital Territory

New South Wales

Northern Territory

Queensland

South Australia

Tasmania

Victoria

Western Australia

Senate
Sitting senators are shown in bold text. Tickets that elected at least one Senator are highlighted in the relevant colour. Successful candidates are identified by an asterisk (*).

Australian Capital Territory
Two Senate places were up for election. The Labor Party was defending one seat. The Liberal Party was defending one seat.

New South Wales
Six Senate places were up for election. The Labor Party was defending three seats. The Liberal-National Coalition was defending two seats. The Australian Democrats were defending one seat. Senators George Campbell (Labor), Helen Coonan (Liberal), Sandy Macdonald (National), Kerry Nettle (Greens), Marise Payne (Liberal) and Ursula Stephens (Labor) were not up for re-election.

Northern Territory
Two Senate places were up for election. The Labor Party was defending one seat. The Country Liberal Party was defending one seat.

Queensland

Six Senate places were up for election. The Labor Party was defending two seats. The Liberal Party was defending two seats. The Australian Democrats were defending one seat. One Nation was defending one seat. Senators Andrew Bartlett (Democrats), Ron Boswell (National), John Hogg (Labor), Ian Macdonald (Liberal), Claire Moore (Labor) and Santo Santoro (Liberal) were not up for re-election.

South Australia
Six Senate places were up for election. The Labor Party was defending two seats. The Liberal Party was defending three seats. The Australian Democrats were defending one seat, although Senator Meg Lees had formed her own party, the Australian Progressive Alliance. Senators Grant Chapman (Liberal), Jeannie Ferris (Liberal), Robert Hill (Liberal), Linda Kirk (Labor), Natasha Stott Despoja (Democrats) and Penny Wong (Labor) were not up for re-election.

Tasmania

Six Senate places are up for election. The Labor Party was defending three seats, although Senator Shayne Murphy had left the party to sit as an independent. The Liberal Party was defending two seats. One seat had been held by the independent senator Brian Harradine. Senators Bob Brown (Greens), Paul Calvert (Liberal), Richard Colbeck (Liberal), Sue Mackay (Labor), Nick Sherry (Labor) and John Watson (Liberal) were not up for re-election.

Victoria
Six Senate places were up for election. The Labor Party was defending three seats. The Liberal-National Coalition was defending three seats. Senators Lyn Allison (Democrats), Mitch Fifield (Liberal), Rod Kemp (Liberal), Gavin Marshall (Labor), Kay Patterson (Liberal) and Robert Ray (Labor) were not up for re-election.

Western Australia
Six Senate places were up for election. The Labor Party was defending two seats. The Liberal Party was defending three seats. The Australian Democrats were defending one seat. Senators Mark Bishop (Labor), Alan Eggleston (Liberal), David Johnston (Liberal), Ross Lightfoot (Liberal), Andrew Murray (Democrats) and Ruth Webber (Labor) were not up for re-election.

Summary by party 
Beside each party is the number of seats contested by that party in the House of Representatives for each state, as well as an indication of whether the party contested the Senate election in the respective state.

References
 ABC Elections

See also
 2004 Australian federal election
 Members of the Australian House of Representatives, 2001–2004
 Members of the Australian House of Representatives, 2004–2007
 Members of the Australian Senate, 2002–2005
 Members of the Australian Senate, 2005–2008
 Candidates of the 2007 Australian federal election
 List of political parties in Australia

2004 elections in Australia
Candidates for Australian federal elections